Robert James Mackintosh (1806-1864), son of Sir James Mackintosh and his second wife, was a British colonial governor.  As Governor of Antigua, he was the viceroy in the Leeward Islands colony between 1850 and 1855.

He married Mary "Molly" Appleton, daughter of the American merchant Nathan Appleton and had a son Ronald.

1806 births
1864 deaths
Governors of British Saint Christopher
Governors of Antigua and Barbuda